Sook, also spelled Suk, is a single-syllable Korean given name, as well as an element in many two-syllable Korean given names. Its meaning differs based on the hanja used to write it.

Meaning and hanja
There are 13 hanja with this reading on the South Korean government's official list of hanja which may be registered for use in given names; they are:

: "uncle"
: "pure"
: "sleep"
: "who"
: "ripe"
: "solemn"
: "schoolroom"
: name of a kind of jade
: "jade bowl"
: "tall and straight"
: "early"
: "deep"
: "beans"

Single-syllable given name
People with the given name Sook include:
Kim Sook (diplomat) (born 1952), South Korean male diplomat
Mun Suk (born 1966), South Korean female cyclist
Kim Sook (comedian) (born 1975), South Korean female comedian

As name element
In the mid-20th century, various names containing this element were popular for newborn Korean girls, including:
Hyun-sook (6th place in 1950, 8th place in 1960)
In-sook (8th place in 1950)
Jung-sook (4th place in 1940, 2nd place in 1950)
Kyung-sook (7th place in 1950, 5th place in 1960)
Mi-sook (2nd place in 1960)
Myung-sook (5th place in 1950)
Young-sook (2nd place in 1940, 1st place in 1950, 4th place in 1960)

Other names containing this element include:
Sook-ja
Eun-sook
Jung-sook
Sung-sook
Yoon-sook

See also
List of Korean given names

References

Korean given names